Jizang (549–623) was a Persian-Chinese Buddhist monk and scholar who is often regarded as the founder of East Asian Mādhyamaka. He is also known as Jiaxiang or Master Jiaxiang because he acquired fame at the Jiaxiang Temple.

Biography
Jizang was born in Jinling (modern Nanjing). Although his father had emigrated from Parthia, he was educated in the Chinese manner. He was quite precocious in spiritual matters, and became a monk at age seven. When he was young, he studied with Falang (法朗, 507–581) at the Xinghuang Temple in Nanjing, and studied the three Madhyamaka treatises (The Treatise on the Middle Way, The Treatise on the Twelve Gates, and The One-Hundred-Verse Treatise) which had been translated by Kumarajiva more than a century before, and it is with these texts that he is most often identified. He became the head monk at Xinghuang Temple upon Falang's death in 581. At age 42, he began travelling through China giving lectures, and ultimately settled at Jiaxing Temple, in modern Shaoxing, Zhejiang province.

In 597, Yang Kuang, later Emperor Yang, the second son of Emperor Wen of the Sui Dynasty, ordered four new temples in the capital Chang'an, and invited Jizang to be in charge of one of them, called Huiri Temple. Jizang accepted, despite the fame of Yang's harshness. Zhiyi (538–597 CE), a respected figure of the Tiantai school, had accepted to become monk at another one of the new temples, and Jizang sought to visit him, but unfortunately he died before Jizang was able to meet him. He was, however, able to correspond with him regarding the Lotus Sutra. Later he moved to another new temple, Riyan Temple. When the Sui Dynasty was succeeded by the Tang Dynasty in 617, he gained the respect and support of the new emperor, Gaozu as well, and became head abbot of four temples.

Between ages 57 and 68, he sought to make more copies of the Lotus Sutra so that more people could be familiar with it. He produced 2,000 copies of the sutra. He also made copies of some of his own commentaries.

Jizang was a prodigious writer, producing close to 50 books in his lifetime. He specialized in commentaries on the three treatises as well as texts from other Buddhist traditions, such as the Lotus and Nirvana sutras. His students included Hyegwan, Korean by nationality, who brought the Three Treatise School to Japan.

Philosophy
The general outlook of the Madhyamaka school is that commitments or attachments to anything, including a logical viewpoint, lead to dukkha (suffering). In commenting on Buddhist treatises, Jizang developed a general methodology of poxie xianzheng ("refuting what is misleading, revealing what is corrective"), by-passing the pitfalls of asserting the truth or falsehood of certain propositions in a final or rigid sense, but using them if they pragmatically lead to the ability to overcome the commitment to dichotomy. He noted that the tendency of many Buddhists to become committed to becoming unattached (shunyata or "emptying") is also itself a commitment that should be avoided. One can avoid this by engaging in the same deconstruction that allowed liberation in the first place, but applied to the false dichotomy between attachment and non-attachment (shūnyatā shūnyatā, or "emptying of emptiness").

Applying this to the traditional two levels of discourse inherited from the Madhyamaka tradition (the conventional, regarding everyday thoughts, and the authentic, which transcends this by analyzing the metaphysical assumptions made in the conventional thinking), Jizang developed his sizhong erdi ("four levels of the two kinds of discourse"), which takes that distinction and adds metadistinctions on three more levels:
 The assumption of existence is conventional, and the idea of nonexistence is authentic.
 The commitment to a distinction between existence and nonexistence is now considered conventional, and the denial of this duality is authentic.
 The distinction between committing to a distinction between existence and nonexistence is now conventional, and the denial of the difference between duality and non-duality is authentic.
 All of these distinctions are deemed conventional, and the authentic discourse regards that any point of view cannot be said to be ultimately true, and is useful only so far as it is corrective in the above sense.
Thus, the attachment to any viewpoint is considered detrimental, and is a cause of life's suffering. To repudiate the misleading finality of any viewpoint, on any level of discourse, is thus corrective and helps overcome destructive attachment.

Selected works
 Zhongguanlun shu (中觀論疏; "Commentary on the Madhyamika shastra")
 Erdi zhang (二諦章"Essay on the Two Levels of Discourse")
 Bailun shu (百論疏; "Commentary on the Shata Shastra")
 Shi er men lun shu (十二門論疏; "Commentary on the Twelve Gate Treatise)
 Sanlun xuanyi (三論玄義; "Profound Meaning of the Three Treatises")
 Erdi yi (二諦意"Meaning of the Two Levels of Discourse")
 Dasheng xuanlun (大乘玄論; "Treatise on the Mystery of the Mahayana")

Notes

Further reading
 Chan, Wing-tsit, trans. (1984). A Source Book in Chinese Philosophy. Princeton, NJ: Princeton University Press. Includes translations of passages of "Treatise on the Two Levels of Truth" and "Profound Meaning of the Three Treatises."
 Cheng, Hsueh-Li (1984). Empty Logic: Madhyamika Buddhism from Chinese Sources. New York: Philosophical Library.
 Cheng, Hsueh-Li (2003). Jizang, in Antonio S. Cua, Encyclopedia of Chinese Philosophy, New York: Routledge, pp. 323–328
 Fox, Allen (1995). "Jizang" in Great Thinkers of the Eastern World, Ian McGreal, ed. New York: HarperCollins, pp. 84–88.
 Fung Yu-lan (1952, 1953). A History of Chinese Philosophy, Vol. 2: The Period of Classical Learning, tr. Derk Bodde. Princeton: Princeton University Press. 
 Kanno, Hiroshi (2002) "The Three Dharma-wheels of Jizang". In: Buddhist and Indian Studies in Honor of Professor Sodo Mori, Hamamatsu: Kokusai Bukkyoto Kyokai. ; pp. 397–412
 Liu, Ming-Wood (1996). Madhyamika Thought in China. University of Hawaii Press.
 Liu, Ming-Wood (1993). The Chinese Madhyamaka Practice of "p'an-chiao": The Case of Chi-Tsang, Bulletin of the School of Oriental and African Studies 56 (1), 96-118 
 Liu, Ming-Wood (1993). A Chinese Madyamaka theory of truth: the case of Chi-Tsang, Philosophy East and West 43 (4), 649-673
 Robinson, Richard (1978). Early Madhyamika in India and China. New York: Samuel Weiser Inc.

External links
Jizang, by Allen Fox, University of Delaware 
Chi Tsang by Lin Sen-shou, on Tzu Chi Humanitarian Centre page

549 births
623 deaths
7th-century Chinese philosophers
Chinese scholars of Buddhism
Northern and Southern dynasties philosophers
Liang dynasty Buddhists
Chen dynasty Buddhists
Sui dynasty Buddhists
Tang dynasty Buddhist monks
Writers from Nanjing
Sui dynasty philosophers
Tang dynasty philosophers
Iranian philosophers
Madhyamaka scholars
Sanron Buddhist monks